Edinburgh supports a large number of active amateur dramatics and musical theatre companies. Most weeks see at least one amateur production running, using one of the myriad small theatres and church halls, many of which are familiar with hosting theatrical productions thanks to being in high demand during the Edinburgh Festival Fringe. Some of the larger companies use the professional stage at the King's Theatre, whilst the City of Edinburgh Council run Church Hill Theatre is one of the most popularly used theatres for amateur companies.

Musical theatre companies
 Allegro
Balerno Theatre Company
Bohemians
Captivate Theatre
Edinburgh Gang Show staged and performed by the Scouts and Guides of Edinburgh.
Edinburgh Music Theatre (EMT)
Edinburgh Gilbert & Sullivan Society
Footlights
 Happy Sad Productions  	 
Melodramatics
Showcase
SMYCMS - no longer active
Southern Light Opera
Tempo
LYAMC

Opera companies
Edinburgh Grand Opera
Edinburgh University Savoy Opera Group
Opera Camerata (formerly Sinfonia Opera).
Edinburgh Studio Opera

Theatre companies
Arkle Theatre Company
BigVillage Theatre Company
Edinburgh Graduate Theatre Group (EGTG)
Edinburgh Makars
Edinburgh Peoples Theatre (EPT)
Edinburgh Theatre Arts
Edinburgh Youth Theatre (defunct)
Holy Cow Theater
Holyrood Amateur Theatrical Society (HATS)
Leitheatre
Saughtonhall Drama Group
Mercators
Portobello Players
Random ACT theatre company
St Columba's Dramatic Society
St Serf's Players
Veracity Theatre

Theatre in Edinburgh